The Deeside Railway was a passenger and goods railway between Aberdeen and Ballater in Aberdeenshire, Scotland. Opening in 1853 to Banchory, an extension reached  Aboyne in 1859. A separate company, the Aboyne & Braemar Railway, built an extension to Ballater and this opened in 1866. The line was used by the Royal Train for travel to and from Balmoral Castle from 1853 and a special 'Messenger Train' ran daily when the Royal Family was in residence.

The railways were absorbed by the Great North of Scotland Railway (GNSR) on 1 August 1875 for the Deeside Railway and 31 January 1876 for the Aboyne & Braemar. The line became part of the London and North Eastern Railway in 1923, and part of British Railways when nationalised in 1948. Passenger services were withdrawn on 28 February 1966 and the line was closed completely to Ballater on 18 July 1966 and to Culter on 2 January 1967.

Construction

A railway to serve Deeside was first suggested in 1845. This was authorised on 16 July 1846, but it was decided to wait for the Aberdeen Railway to open first. Shareholders wanted their money back when the railway mania bubble burst, but it survived because the Aberdeen Railway bought a large number of shares. Interest was restored after Prince Albert purchased Balmoral Castle, to which the Royal Family made their first visit in 1848, and the Aberdeen Railway was able to sell their shares. Investors were still hard to find, but by limiting the railway to a line between Ferryhill, in Aberdeen, and Banchory the Deeside Railway was able to apply to Parliament for permission in 1852. Permission was granted, and the railway opened on 7 September 1853. On opening, the terminus of the railway was at Aberdeen Ferryhill railway station, which was also the terminus of the Aberdeen Railway at the time. The railway was extended north to a new terminus, Aberdeen Guild Street, in 1854.

A special train with 15 carriages travelled from Aberdeen to Banchory, and public services began the next day. First  class accommodation was available for d a mile, reduced to 1 d a mile for third class. Initially the service terminated in Aberdeen at Ferryhill station, but this was extended to Guild Street when that opened in 1854, the Deeside Railway paying £700 for the first three years and then £1000 a year for the running rights. Initially the Aberdeen Railway operated the services, but only made one locomotive available, so the Deeside decided to buy its own rolling stock, and this was in service by summer 1854.

A new company, the Aboyne Extension, was formed to reach Aboyne, and the Deeside agreed to operate services. Instead of building two bridges across the Dee, as had been proposed on 1846, the railway instead took a cheaper but  longer route through Lumphanan. The railway was authorised on 27 July 1857, and services began on 2 December 1859. This would follow the Dee, and to cross it  from its terminus. This  route was approved on 5 July 1865, and opened to Ballater on 17 October 1866. Some work was done on the line to Bridge of Gairn, but remained unfinished.

Royal services

On 10 October 1853, the Duchess of Kent, Queen Victoria's mother, caught a special train from Banchory to Ferryhill. This left just after 1 pm and took 16 minutes to reach Ferryhill. The Queen and Albert followed three days later. As the line was extended up Deeside, closer to Balmoral, the terminus became the royal station. On 20 and 24 September 1866 the Prince and Princess of Wales, used Ballater station nearly a month before public services reached the station.

The line was cleared fifteen minutes before the train was due, the facing points and level crossing gates were locked and stations closed. At first Victoria visited once a year, this becoming twice a year after  Albert died in 1861. The number of visits returned to one a year after Edward VII became King in 1901 and the train became faster, although and a slower schedule was later used for George V.

From 8 October 1865 a daily special 'Messenger Train' ran when the Royal Family was at Balmoral. This left Aberdeen at 4 am, connecting with a service from London that had left the previous morning, and returned at 2:15 pm to connect with the night train travelling south. First class accommodation was available on these trains; accompanying servants were charged third class fares. The last Messenger Train ran in 1938, subsequently couriers used a motor car from Perth.

Great North of Scotland Railway
In the late 1850s and early 1860s the Great North of Scotland Railway (GNSR) and the Scottish North Eastern Railway (SNER) were in conflict over the building of a joint station in Aberdeen. Whilst in discussions with the SNER, a lease on the Deeside Railway was offered to the GNSR, who rapidly accepted. The Deeside board accepted the lease by a majority vote on 13 May 1862, and it was approved by Parliament on 30 July 1866. The Aboyne & Braemar remained independent, although services were operated by the GNSR.

Services
When the battery multiple unit was introduced, services were doubled to six trains a day from 21 April 1958, and Sunday service reinstated. The line was chosen for testing the unit because the stations were well spaced and the 1 in 70 ruling gradients would require substantial discharge rates.

Closure 

Passenger services were withdrawn on 28 February 1966 and the line was closed completely to Ballater on 18 July 1966 and to Culter on 2 January 1967. Balnacraig viaduct, a five-arch structure between Torphins and Lumphanan which carried the railway, was demolished in June 1989.

Future 
A group, called Campaign for North East Rail, was launched in April 2021 and is campaigning for the reinstatement of the Deeside Railway between Aberdeen and Banchory.

See also
Royal Deeside Railway
Deeside Way

Notes and references

Notes

References

Books

Further reading

External links
 
 
 
 

Great North of Scotland Railway
Railway companies established in 1852
Railway lines opened in 1853
London and North Eastern Railway
Standard gauge railways in Scotland
1852 establishments in Scotland
British companies established in 1852